Personopsis trigonaperta is a species of medium-sized sea snail, a marine gastropod mollusk in the family Personidae, the Distorsio snails.

Description
The length of the shell attains 25.9 mm.

Distribution
This marine species occurs off New Caledonia and Vanuatu

References

Personidae
Gastropods described in 1998